Terrible's Hotel & Casino, formerly the Gold Strike Hotel and Gambling Hall, is a defunct casino hotel in Jean, Nevada, approximately  north of the California state line, and about  south of Downtown Las Vegas. It opened in 1987, and closed in 2020. It was owned and operated by JETT Gaming from 2015 until its closure. The property is planned to be demolished and replaced with an industrial park.

History

The Gold Strike was opened in December 1987 by Dave Belding and two other partners who owned the original Gold Strike Hotel near Boulder City. After it did better business than expected, a sister property, the Nevada Landing Hotel and Casino, was developed on the other side of the freeway and opened in 1989.

The two properties became part of the Gold Strike Resorts family of companies, which was acquired in 1995 by Circus Circus Enterprises (later named Mandalay Resort Group). They were then acquired in 2005 by MGM Mirage (later named MGM Resorts International) as part of its buyout of Mandalay.

In February 2007, MGM Mirage announced plans to close the Nevada Landing and build a master-planned community and a new casino hotel on the  it owned in the area, in a joint venture with American Nevada Corp. and the Cloobeck Cos. The Gold Strike would remain open. The Nevada Landing closed in March 2007 and was demolished, leaving the Gold Strike as the only casino in Jean. The planned redevelopment was canceled in 2008, however, because of the economic downturn.

In October 2014, MGM agreed to sell the Gold Strike for $12 million to JETT Gaming, owned by the Herbst family. The sale was completed in May 2015.

JETT Gaming performed upgrades and renovations to the property, including the installation of a new video marquee sign, the Off-Road Motorsports Hall of Fame, and a display of cars from popular movies. On November 1, 2018, the name of the casino was changed from Gold Strike to Terrible's, the same name used by the Herbst family's convenience stores and gas stations.

Terrible's and other state casinos closed temporarily in March 2020, due to the COVID-19 pandemic in Nevada. In November 2021, it announced that the Terrible's closure was indefinite. In February 2022, the property was sold for $45 million to real estate company Tolles Development, which planned to demolish it to make way for an industrial park.

In April 2022, filmmakers filed plans to shoot an action film at the closed property. The film, Absolute Dominion, would be directed by Lexi Alexander and produced by Jason Blum. It would be set in 2085, with much of the human population killed by religious terrorists. The United Nations creates a martial arts tournament with the winner gaining "Absolute Dominion for one faith".

References

External links
 

1987 establishments in Nevada
2020 disestablishments in Nevada
Casino hotels
Casinos completed in 1987
Defunct casinos in Nevada
Hotel buildings completed in 1987
Hotels established in 1987
Jean, Nevada
Mandalay Resort Group